Leigh is a village and civil parish in the district of Tewkesbury, in the county of Gloucestershire, England. As of 2019, it has a population of 325.

History 
The name "Leigh" means 'The wood/clearing'. Leigh was recorded in the Domesday Book as Lalege.

References

External links

Villages in Gloucestershire
Civil parishes in Gloucestershire
Borough of Tewkesbury